GNUPanel is a hosting control panel for Debian. It is written in PHP and it is tailored to run on 32 and 64-bit Debian Linux web hosting servers.
The administrator can create public and private hosting plans, accept PayPal, Cuentadigital and Dineromail payments, send messages to users, create redirections, use an integrated support ticket system, control bandwidth, disk space and define policies for account suspension.
It provides the usual functions to create mail and FTP accounts, databases, directory security, etc. Additional functionality is included for domain parking and subdomain control over PHP directives including safe_mode and register_globals.
GNUPanel stores its configuration in a PostgreSQL 9.1 database and provides three web interfaces with SSL access.  User, reseller and administrator accounts may be created.

Despite the prefix GNU in its name, GNUPanel is not part of the GNU Project.

Main features:
 Subdomain administration
 Parked domains
 Mail accounts and redirections
 FTP accounts
 Directory security control
 Mailing lists
 PostgreSQL and MySQL web administration
 Bandwidth and disk space management
 Website statistics
 Support tickets
 English and Spanish languages
 PayPal payments support
 Autoinstallation for Joomla, phpBB, WordPress and osCommerce
 Backup tool

Software and daemons:
 Apache 2
 PowerDNS
 Proftpd
 Postfix
 Courier-pop, Courier-pop-ssl
 Courier-imap, Courier-imap-ssl
 Courier-authdaemon
 Squirrelmail
 Mailman
 PHP 5
 PostgreSQL 8.1
 MySQL 5
 phpPgAdmin
 phpMyAdmin
 Webalizer / AWStats statistics

See also 
 cPanel
 DirectAdmin
 Domain Technologie Control
 ISPConfig
 Kloxo (formerly known as Lxadmin)
 Plesk
 Webmin

References

External links
 Official website

Debian
Web hosting
Web applications
Website management
Web server management software
WordPress